The 2022 World Taekwondo Junior Championships, the 13th edition of the World Taekwondo Junior Championships, was held in Sofia,  Bulgaria from 2 to 7 August 2022.

Medal table

Medal summary

Men

Women

References

External links 
 Results

World Taekwondo Junior Championships
World Taekwondo Junior Championships
International taekwondo competitions hosted by Bulgaria
Sports competitions in Sofia
World Taekwondo
World Taekwondo